Live at the Heineken Music Hall is the debut live album by Dutch singer Caro Emerald with The Grandmono Orchestra. The album was recorded in December 2010 and released in May 2011.

Background
In December 2010 Emerald with a 16-piece Orchestra including strings, horns and percussion played three sold out shows at the Heineken Music Hall in Amsterdam, Netherlands.

Track listing 
 CD/DVD
 "Intro Greg Shapiro"	
 "Zoot Suit Theme"	
 "Absolutely Me"	
 "Just One Dance"	
 "You Don't Love Me"	
 "Muchos Besos"
 "Back It Up"	
 "The Other Woman"	
 "Close to Me"
 "Riviera Life"
 "Dr. Wanna Do"	
 "Caro's Lament"	
 "I Know That He's Mine"	
 "The Lipstick On His Collar"	
 "Bad Romance"	
 "That Man"	
 "A Night like This"	
 "Two Hearts"	
 "Stuck"

Charts

References 

Caro Emerald albums
2011 albums
Jazz albums by Dutch artists